The fifth competition weekend of the 2013–14 ISU Speed Skating World Cup was held in Eisstadion Inzell in Inzell, Germany, from Friday, 7 March, until Sunday, 9 March 2014.

By winning the men's 1000 meters race, Shani Davis of the United States secured the men's 1000 metres World Cup, as he extended his lead to 210 points, with only 150 points available for the winner on the last competition weekend.

Schedule
The detailed schedule of events:

All times are CET (UTC+1).

Medal summary

Men's events

Women's events

Standings
The top ten standings in the contested cups after the weekend.

Men's cups
500 m

1000 m

1500 m

5000/10000 m

Mass start

Grand World Cup

Women's cups
500 m

1000 m

1500 m

3000/5000 m

Mass start

Grand World Cup

References

 
5
Isu World Cup, 2013-14, 5
Sports competitions in Bavaria